Super Sale is the third and final studio album by Caveman Shoestore, released in 2005 by Build-a-Buzz Records.

Track listing

Personnel
Adapted from the Super Sale liner notes.

Caveman Shoestore
 Fred Chalenor – Bass guitar, Chapman Stick
 Elaine di Falco – keyboards, vocals
 Henry Franzoni – drums, voice 

Production and design
 Mel Dettmer – mastering
 Randall Dunn – production, recording, mixing
 Bob Stark – additional engineering

Release history

References

External links 
 Super Sale at Discogs (list of releases)

2005 albums
Caveman Shoestore albums